The Sebastopol is a breed of domestic goose, descended from the European Greylag goose. First exhibited in England in 1860 under the name 'Sebastopol goose'; they were also referred to as Danubian geese; a name first used for the breed in Ireland in 1863. 'Danubian' was used as a synonym in the 19th century; and only given precedence by Edward Brown after the turn of the 19th century. The Sebastopol is a medium-sized goose with long, white curly feathers. The feathers of the neck are smooth and sometimes greyish brown. Crosses have produced all-grey, buff, and saddle back variants. Feathers on the breast may be curly (frizzle) or smooth.  The gander weighs 12-14 lbs while the goose weighs 10-12 lbs. The legs and shanks are orange and the eyes bright blue. Grey and buff colored Sebastopol have brown eyes. On average, females produce 25-35 eggs per year.
Though domesticated breeds of geese generally retain some flight ability, Sebastopols cannot fly well due to the curliness of their feathers and have difficulty getting off the ground.  They need plenty of water to keep themselves clean, and to clean their sinuses (as do all waterfowl).

In German, they are called Lockengans or Struppgans, meaning "curl-goose" and "unkempt goose".

History

It has been stated the breed was developed in Central Europe along the Danube and the Black Sea. However, it is documented that the birds were originally met with in the Crimea and sent from the port of Sevastopol, as the name implies, and arrived in England in 1860. By the 19th century they were found in all the countries surrounding the Black Sea. The alternate name Danubian reflected their prevalence around the river Danube. They were originally bred to use their curly feathers in pillows and quilts.

Breeding

Breeding over the last hundred years has increased the average weight of the birds by thirty percent. This occurred in America due to matings with Embden Geese made in the late 19th century.

See also
List of goose breeds
Embden Geese
Toulouse Geese

Gallery

References

 Ashton, Chris (1999) Domestic Geese  
 Brown, Edward (1906) Races of Domestic Poultry Pub. Edward Arnold. London.
 Holderread, Dave (1981) The Book of Geese: a Complete Guide to Raising the Home Flock 
 Journal of Horticulture (1863) 13 January. Pub.London.
 Kear, Janet and Hulme, Mark (2005) Ducks, Geese and Swans 
 Luttmann, Gail and Rick (1978) Ducks & Geese in your Backyard 
 Robinson, John H. (1912) Principles and Practice of Poultry Culture
 Tegetmeier, William Bernhard and Weir, Harrison (1867). The Poultry Book: Comprising the Breeding and Management of Profitable and Ornamental Poultry, their Qualities and Characteristics
 Weir, Harrison; Johnson, W.G.; Brown, G.O. (1904) The Poultry Book. Pub. Doubleday, Page & Co. New York
 Wright, Lewis (1885) Book of Poultry 
 Domestic Waterfowl Club Sebastopol article

External links
 Sebastopol Geese on poultrykeeper. British Breed Standard information and photos.

Goose breeds
Animal breeds on the RBST Watchlist